Megatron is the leader of the Decepticons in the Transformers robot superhero franchise.

Megatron may also refer to:
Variations of the character in the Transformers robot superhero franchise:
 Megatron (Beast Era), a different character and the leader of the Predacons in Beast Wars and the leader of the Vehicons in Beast Machines. 
 Megatronus Prime, the original name of the Fallen
 Megatron (engine), a rebadged BMW turbocharged Formula 1 motor
"Megatron" (song), a 2019 song by Nicki Minaj

Nicknames 
 Calvin Johnson (born 1985), NFL wide receiver for the Detroit Lions (2007–2015)
 DJ Megatron (1978–2011), an American DJ and radio and TV personality (real name Corey McGriff)

See also
Metatron, an alternate name for Enoch in the Gnostic scriptures
Cavity magnetron, a high-powered vacuum tube that generates microwaves
Pegatron, Taiwanese electronics manufacturing company